The Kościuszko Uprising, also known as the Polish Uprising of 1794 and the Second Polish War, was an uprising against the Russian Empire and the Kingdom of Prussia led by Tadeusz Kościuszko in the Polish–Lithuanian Commonwealth and the Prussian partition in 1794. It was a failed attempt to liberate the Polish–Lithuanian Commonwealth from external influence after the Second Partition of Poland (1793) and the creation of the Targowica Confederation.

Background

Decline of the Commonwealth
By the early 18th century, the magnates of Poland and Lithuania controlled the state – or rather, they managed to ensure that no reforms would be carried out that might weaken their privileged status (the "Golden Freedoms"). Through the abuse of the liberum veto rule which enabled any deputy to paralyze the Sejm (Commonwealth's parliament) proceedings, deputies bribed by magnates or foreign powers or those simply content to believe they were living in an unprecedented "Golden Age", paralysed the Commonwealth's government for over a century.

The idea of reforming the Commonwealth gained traction starting from the mid-17th century. It was, however, viewed with suspicion not only by its magnates but also by neighboring countries, which were content with the deterioration of the Commonwealth and abhorred the thought of a resurgent and democratic power on their borders. With the Commonwealth Army reduced to around 16,000, it was easy for its neighbors to intervene directly (The Imperial Russian Army numbered 300,000; The Prussian Army and Imperial Austrian Army, 200,000 each).

Attempts at reform
A major opportunity for reform presented itself during the "Great Sejm" of 1788–92. Poland's neighbors were preoccupied with wars and unable to intervene forcibly in Polish affairs. Russia and Austria were engaged in hostilities with the Ottoman Empire (the Russo-Turkish War, 1787–1792 and the Austro-Turkish War, 1787–1791); the Russians also found themselves simultaneously fighting in the Russo-Swedish War, 1788–1790. A new alliance between the Polish–Lithuanian Commonwealth and Prussia seemed to provide security against Russian intervention, and on 3 May 1791 the new constitution was read and adopted to overwhelming popular support.

With the wars between Turkey and Russia and Sweden and Russia having ended, Empress Catherine was furious over the adoption of the new constitution, which she believed threatened Russian influence in Poland. Russia had viewed Poland as a de facto protectorate. "The worst possible news has arrived from Warsaw: the Polish king has become almost sovereign" was the reaction of one of Russia's chief foreign policy authors, Alexander Bezborodko, when he learned of the new constitution. Prussia was also strongly opposed to the new constitution, and Polish diplomats received a note that the new constitution changed the Polish state so much that Prussia did not consider its obligations binding. Just like Russia, Prussia was concerned that the newly strengthened Polish state could become a threat and the Prussian foreign minister, Friedrich Wilhelm von Schulenburg-Kehnert,  clearly and with rare candor told the Poles that Prussia did not support the constitution and refused to help the Commonwealth in any form, even as a mediator, as it was not in Prussia's state interest to see the Commonwealth strengthened as it could threaten Prussia in the future. The Prussian statesman Ewald von Hertzberg expressed the fears of European conservatives: "The Poles have given the coup de grâce to the Prussian monarchy by voting a constitution", elaborating that a strong Commonwealth would likely demand the return of the lands Prussia acquired in the First Partition.

Second Partition of Poland
The Constitution was not adopted without dissent in the Commonwealth itself, either. Magnates who had opposed the constitution draft from the start, namely Franciszek Ksawery Branicki, Stanisław Szczęsny Potocki, Seweryn Rzewuski, and Szymon and Józef Kossakowski, asked Tsaritsa Catherine to intervene and restore their privileges such as the Russian-guaranteed Cardinal Laws abolished under the new statute. To that end these magnates formed the Targowica Confederation. The Confederation's proclamation, prepared in St. Petersburg in January 1792, criticized the constitution for contributing to, in their own words, "contagion of democratic ideas" following "the fatal examples set in Paris". It asserted that "The parliament ... has broken all fundamental laws, swept away all liberties of the gentry and on the third of May 1791 turned into a revolution and a conspiracy." The Confederates declared an intention to overcome this revolution. We "can do nothing but turn trustingly to Tsarina Catherine, a distinguished and fair empress, our neighboring friend and ally", who "respects the nation's need for well-being and always offers it a helping hand", they wrote. The Confederates aligned with Catherine and asked her for military intervention. On 18 May 1792 the Russian ambassador to Poland, Yakov Bulgakov, delivered a declaration of war to Polish Foreign Minister Joachim Chreptowicz. Russian armies entered Poland and Lithuania on the same day, starting the Polish–Russian War of 1792. The war ended without any decisive battles, with a capitulation signed by Polish King Stanisław August Poniatowski, who hoped that a diplomatic compromise could be worked out.

King Poniatowski's hopes that the capitulation would allow an acceptable diplomatic solution to be worked out were soon dashed. With new deputies bribed or intimidated by the Russian troops, a new session of parliament, known as the Grodno Sejm, took place, in fall 1793. On 23 November 1793, it concluded its deliberations under duress, annulling the constitution and acceding to the Second Partition. Russia took , while Prussia took  of the Commonwealth's territory. This event reduced Poland's population to only one-third of what it was before the partitions began in 1772. The rump state was garrisoned by Russian troops and its independence was strongly curtailed. Such an outcome was a giant blow for the members of the Targowica Confederation, who saw their actions as a defense of the centuries-old privileges of the magnates, but now were regarded by the majority of the Polish population as traitors.

Growing unrest
The Polish military was widely dissatisfied with the capitulation, most commanders considering it premature; Tadeusz Kościuszko, Prince Józef Poniatowski and many others would criticize the king's decision and many, including Kościuszko, resigned their commission shortly afterward. After the Commonwealth defeat in that war and the rescinding of the Constitution, the Army was reduced to about 36,000. In 1794 Russians demanded a further downsizing of the army to 15,000. The dissent in the Polish Army was one of the sparks that would lead to the coming conflict.

The King's capitulation was a hard blow for Kościuszko, who had not lost a single battle in the campaign. By mid September he was resigned to leave the country, and he departed Warsaw in early October. Kościuszko settled in Leipzig, where many other notable Polish commanders and politicians formed an émigrée community. Soon he and some others began preparing an uprising against Russian rule in Poland. The politicians, grouped around Ignacy Potocki and Hugo Kołłątaj, sought contacts with similar opposition groups formed in Poland and by spring 1793 had been joined by other politicians and revolutionaries, including Ignacy Działyński. While Kołłątaj and others had begun planning for the uprising before meeting Kościuszko, his support was a major boon for them, as he was, at that time, among the most popular individuals in the entire Poland.

In August 1793 Kościuszko returned to Leipzig where he was met with demands to start planning for the uprising; however, he was worried that an uprising would have little chance against the three partitioners. In September he would clandestinely cross the Polish border to conduct personal observations, and to meet some sympathetic high-ranking officers in the remaining Polish Army, including general Józef Wodzicki. The preparations in Poland were slow and he decided to postpone the outbreak, and left for Italy, planning to return in February. However, the situation in Poland was changing rapidly. The Russian and Prussian governments forced Poland to again disband the majority of her armed forces and the reduced units were to be drafted into the Russian army. Also, in March the tsarist agents discovered the group of revolutionaries in Warsaw and started arresting notable Polish politicians and military commanders. Kościuszko was forced to execute his plan earlier than expected, and on 15 March 1794 he set off for Kraków.

On 12 March 1794, General Antoni Madaliński, the commander of 1st Greater Polish National Cavalry Brigade (1,500 men) decided to disobey the order to demobilise, advancing his troops from Ostrołęka to Kraków. This sparked an outbreak of riots against Russian forces throughout the country. The Russian garrison of Kraków was ordered to leave the city and confront Madalinski, which left Kraków completely undefended, but also foiled Kosciuszko's plan to seize their weapons.

Uprising

On 24 March 1794, Tadeusz Kościuszko, a veteran of the Continental Army in the American Revolutionary War, announced the general uprising in a speech in the Kraków town square and assumed the powers of the Commander in Chief of all of the Polish forces. He also vowed

In order to strengthen the Polish forces, Kościuszko issued an act of mobilisation, requiring that every 5 houses in Lesser Poland delegate at least one able male soldier equipped with carbine, pike, or an axe. Kościuszko's Commission for Order in Kraków recruited all males between 18 and 28 years of age and passed an income tax. The difficulties with providing enough armament for the mobilised troops made Kościuszko form large units composed of peasants armed with scythes, called the "scythemen".

To destroy the still weak opposition, Russian Empress Catherine the Great ordered the corps of Major General Fiodor Denisov to attack Kraków. On 4 April both armies met near the village of Racławice. In what became known as the Battle of Racławice Kościuszko's forces defeated the numerically and technically superior opponent. After the bloody battle the Russian forces withdrew from the battlefield. Kościuszko's forces were too weak to start a successful pursuit and wipe the Russian forces out of Lesser Poland. Although the strategic importance of the victory was close to none, the news of the victory spread fast and soon other parts of Poland joined the ranks of the revolutionaries. By early April the Polish forces concentrated in the lands of Lublin and Volhynia, ready to be sent to Russia, joined the ranks of Kościuszko's forces.

On 17 April in Warsaw, the Russian attempt to arrest those suspected of supporting the insurrection and to disarm the weak Polish garrison of Warsaw under Gen. Stanisław Mokronowski by seizing the arsenal at Miodowa Street resulted in an uprising against the Russian garrison of Warsaw, led by Jan Kiliński, in the face of indecisiveness of the King of Poland, Stanisław II Augustus. The insurgents were aided by the incompetence of Russian ambassador and commander, Iosif Igelström, and the chosen day being the Thursday of Holy Week when many soldiers of the Russian garrison went to the churches for the Eucharist not carrying their arms. Finally, from the onset of the insurrection, the Polish forces were aided by the civilian population and had surprise on their side as they attacked many separate groups of soldiers at the same time and the resistance to Russian forces quickly spread over the city. After two days of heavy fighting the Russians, who suffered between 2,000 and 4,000 casualties out of an initial 5,000 strong garrison, were forced to leave the city. A similar uprising was started by Jakub Jasiński in Vilnius on 23 April and soon other cities and towns followed. The massacre of unarmed Russian soldiers attending the Easter service was regarded as a "crime against humanity" by Russians and was a cause of vengeance later, during the siege of Warsaw.

On 7 May 1794, Kościuszko issued an act that became known as the "Proclamation of Połaniec", in which he partially abolished serfdom in Poland, granted civil liberty to all peasants and provided them with state help against abuses by the nobility. Although the new law never fully came into being and was boycotted by much of the nobility, it also attracted many peasants to the ranks of the revolutionaries. It was the first time in Polish history that the peasants were officially regarded as part of the nation, the word being previously equivalent to nobility.

Despite the promise of reforms and quick recruitment of new forces, the strategic situation of the Polish forces, which consisted of 6,000 peasants, cavalry, and 9,000 soldiers, was still critical. On 10 May the forces of Prussia (17,500 soldiers under General Francis Favrat), crossed the Polish borders and joined the 9,000 Russian soldiers operating in northern Poland. On 6 June Kościuszko was defeated in the Battle of Szczekociny by a joint Russo-Prussian force and on 8 June General Józef Zajączek was defeated in the Battle of Chełm. Polish forces withdrew towards Warsaw and started to fortify the city under directions from Kosciuszko and his 16,000 soldiers, 18,000 peasants and 15,000 burghers. On 15 June the Prussian army captured Kraków unopposed.  Warsaw was besieged by 41,000 Russians under General Ivan Fersen and 25,000 Prussians under King Frederick William II of Prussia on 13 July. On 20 August, an uprising in Greater Poland started and the Prussians were forced to withdraw their forces from Warsaw. The siege was lifted by 6 September when the Prussians and Russians had both withdrawn their troops.

Although the opposition in Lithuania was crushed by Russian forces (Vilnius was besieged and capitulated on 12 August), the uprising in Greater Poland achieved some success. A Polish corps under Jan Henryk Dąbrowski captured Bydgoszcz (2 October) and entered Pomerania almost unopposed. Thanks to the mobility of his forces, General Dąbrowski evaded being encircled by a much less mobile Prussian army and disrupted the Prussian lines, forcing the Prussians to withdraw most of their forces from central Poland. However, the Poles did not stay long in Prussian territories, and soon retreated to Central Poland.

Meanwhile, the Russians equipped a new corps commanded by General Aleksandr Suvorov and ordered it to join up with the corps under Ivan Fersen near Warsaw. After the Battle of Krupczyce (17 September) and the Battle of Terespol (19 September), the new army started its march towards Warsaw. Trying to prevent both Russian armies from joining up, Kościuszko mobilised two regiments from Warsaw and with General Sierakowski's 5,000 soldiers, engaged Fersen's force of 14,000 on 10 October in the Battle of Maciejowice. Kościuszko was wounded in the battle and was captured by the Russians, who sent him to Saint Petersburg.

The new commander of the uprising, Tomasz Wawrzecki, could not control the spreading internal struggles for power and ultimately became only the commander of weakened military forces, while the political power was held by General Józef Zajączek, who in turn had to struggle with both the leftist liberal Polish Jacobins and the rightist and monarchical nobility.

On 4 November the joint Russian forces started the Battle of Praga, after the name of the right-bank suburb of Warsaw where it took place. After four hours of brutal hand-to-hand fighting, the 22,000-strong Russian forces broke through the Polish defences and Suvorov allowed his Cossacks to loot and burn Warsaw. Approximately 20,000 were murdered in the Praga massacre. Zajaczek fled wounded, abandoning the Polish army.

On 16 November, near Radoszyce, Wawrzecki surrendered. This marked the end of the uprising. The power of Poland was broken and the following year the third partition of Poland took place, after which Austria, Russia and Prussia annexed the remainder of the country.

Aftermath
After the failure of the Kościuszko Uprising, Poland ceased to exist for 123 years, and all of its institutions were gradually banned by the partitioning powers. However, the uprising also marked the start of modern political thought in Poland and Central Europe. Kościuszko's Proclamation of Połaniec and the radical leftist Jacobins started the Polish leftist movement. Many prominent Polish politicians who were active during the uprising became the backbone of Polish politics, both at home and abroad, in the 19th century. Also, Prussia had much of its forces tied up in Poland and could not field enough forces to suppress the French Revolution, which added to its success and briefly restored a Polish state.

In the lands of partitioned Poland, the failure of the uprising meant economic catastrophe, as centuries-old economic markets became divided and separated from each other, resulting in the collapse of trade. Several banks fell and some of the few manufacturing centres established in the Commonwealth were closed. Reforms made by the reformers and Kosciuszko, aimed at easing serfdom, were revoked. All the partitioning powers heavily taxed their newly acquired lands, filling their treasuries at the expense of the local population.

The schooling system was also degraded as the schools in those territories were given low priority. The Commission of National Education, the world's first Ministry of Education, was abolished, because the absolutist governments of the partitioning powers saw no gain in investing in education in the territories inhabited by restless Polish minorities. The creation of educational institutions in the partitions became very difficult. For example, an attempt to create a university in Warsaw was opposed by the Prussian authorities. Further, in the German and Russian partitions, all remaining centers of learning were subject to Germanisation and Russification; only in territories acquired by Austria was there relatively little governmental intervention in the curriculum. According to S. I. Nikołajew, from the cultural point of view the partitions may have given a step forward towards the development of national Polish literature and arts, since the inhabitants of partitioned lands could acquire the cultural developments of German and Russian Enlightenment.

The conditions for the former Polish elite were particularly harsh in Russian partition. Thousands of Polish szlachta families who supported Kościuszo's uprising were stripped of their possessions and estates, which were awarded to Russian generals and favourites of the St. Petersburg court. It is estimated that 650,000 former Polish serfs were transferred to Russian officials in this manner. Some among the nobility, especially in Lithuanian and Ruthenian regions of the former Commonwealth, were expelled to southern Russia, where they were subject to Russification. Other nobles were denied their nobility status by Russian authorities, which meant loss of legal privileges and social status, significantly limiting any possibility of a career in administration or the military - the traditional career paths of Polish nobles. It also meant that they could not own any land, another blow to their former noble status. But for Orthodox Christian peasants of Western Ukraine and Belarus, the partition may have brought the decline of religious oppression by their formal lords, followers of Roman Catholicism.

However, Orthodox Christians were only a small minority in Eastern Belarus at that time; the prevailing majority of the country's population was Eastern rite Catholics. Peasants were flogged just for mentioning the name of Kościuszko and his idea of abolishing serfdom. Platon Zubov, who was awarded estates in Lithuania, was especially infamous, as he personally tortured to death many peasants who complained about worsening conditions. Besides this, the Russian authorities conducted heavy recruiting for the Russian army among the population, which meant a practically lifelong service. Since the conditions of serfdom in former Poland due to the exploitation by nobility and arendators were already severe, discussion exists on how partitions influenced the life of common people.

See also
 Supreme National Council
 Polish Uprisings
 Battle of Praga
 the painting Racławice Panorama

Notes

References

External links

 
Resistance to the Russian Empire
Conflicts in 1794
Tadeusz Kościuszko
1794 in the Polish–Lithuanian Commonwealth
Polish–Lithuanian Commonwealth–Russian Empire relations